is a railway station in Higashihiroshima, Hiroshima Prefecture, Japan, operated by West Japan Railway Company (JR West).

Lines
Shiraichi Station is served by the Sanyō Main Line.

Layout
Shiraichi Station has one side platform, one island platform and a station office on ground. The two platforms are connected by a footbridge.

See also
 List of railway stations in Japan

External links

  

Railway stations in Hiroshima Prefecture
Sanyō Main Line
Railway stations in Japan opened in 1895